LaRod Stephens-Howling (born April 26, 1987) is a former American football running back and kickoff returner. He was drafted by the Arizona Cardinals in the seventh round of the 2009 NFL Draft. He played college football at Pittsburgh. He was also a member of the Pittsburgh Steelers. Stephens-Howling now serves as the running backs coach for Robert Morris Colonials football.

Early years
Stephens-Howling is a native of Johnstown, Pennsylvania. He attended Greater Johnstown High School, where he competed in football, baseball, wrestling, and track.

College career
Stephens-Howling played college football for the University of Pittsburgh Panthers. He was the starter for the Panthers before being replaced by future NFL Pro Bowl running back LeSean McCoy in 2007.

Professional career

Arizona Cardinals
Stephens-Howling was drafted by the Arizona Cardinals in the seventh round of the 2009 NFL Draft with the 240th overall pick. In addition to playing running back, Stephens-Howling returned kickoffs for the team. On November 1, 2009, Stephens-Howling recorded his first NFL touchdown on a 14-yard reception from quarterback Kurt Warner against the Carolina Panthers. On November 29, 2009, Stephens-Howling returned a Rob Bironas kickoff 99 yards for a touchdown against the Tennessee Titans. On September 26, 2010, Stephens-Howling returned the opening kickoff 102 yards for a touchdown against the Oakland Raiders. On October 31, 2010, he scored his first rushing touchdown after bouncing out near the sidelines and running 30 yards against the Tampa Bay Buccaneers. On December 4, 2011, Stephens-Howling scored the game-winning touchdown in overtime against the Dallas Cowboys on a 52-yard reception from Kevin Kolb. He became a restricted free agent following the 2011 season, but was re-signed by the Cardinals on April 16, 2012.

Pittsburgh Steelers
Stephens-Howling signed with the Pittsburgh Steelers on April 26, 2013. At the beginning of the 2013 season against the Tennessee Titans, he tore his ACL and missed the rest of the season after undergoing surgery.

Personal life
in 2017, Stephens-Howling joined Robert Morris' coaching staff as the running backs coach.

References

External links
Robert Morris Colonials coaching bio
LaRod Stephens-Howling

1987 births
Living people
Sportspeople from Johnstown, Pennsylvania
Players of American football from Pennsylvania
American football running backs
American football return specialists
Pittsburgh Panthers football players
Arizona Cardinals players
Pittsburgh Steelers players